Adam Daniel Eriksson (born 2 February 1988) is a Swedish footballer who plays for Ljungskile SK as a defender.

References

External links
  (archive)
 
 

1988 births
Living people
Association football defenders
Swedish footballers
Allsvenskan players
Superettan players
Örgryte IS players
Ljungskile SK players